is a private university in Aichi Prefecture, Japan, with campuses in Nagoya and Toyota. The main building is located in Yagoto, Shōwa-ku, Nagoya.

Notable faculty members
 Naomi Miyake, cognitive scientist
 Koji Murofushi, Olympic hammer thrower
 Carl Stone, experimental composer and musician

Notable alumni
 Miki Ando, Olympic skater, two-time world champion
 Mao Asada, Olympic silver medalist skater, three-time world champion
 Takahiko Kozuka, Olympic skater
 Jun Maeda, scenario writer, lyricist
 Ryo Miyaichi, Arsenal football player
 Masanari Omura, football player
 Shoma Uno, three-time Olympic medalist figure skater, 2022 World Figure Skating Champion
 Kosei Tanaka, three-division world boxing champion, current world flyweight title holder
 Yuma Kagiyama, Olympic and world silver medalist skater

See also
 Chukyo Junior College, in Gifu Prefecture

References

External links

 

Private universities and colleges in Japan
Universities and colleges in Nagoya
Yagoto
Toyota, Aichi